The 1975 Bavarian Tennis Championships was a men's Grand Prix tennis circuit tournament held in Munich, West Germany. The tournament was played on outdoor clay courts and was held from 7 May though 11 May 1975. First-seeded Guillermo Vilas won the singles title.

Finals

Singles

 Guillermo Vilas defeated  Karl Meiler 2–6, 6–0, 6–2, 6–3
 It was Vilas's 2nd title of the year and the 15th of his career.

Doubles

 Wojtek Fibak /  Jan Kodeš defeated  Milan Holeček /  Karl Meiler 7–5, 6–3
 It was Fibak's 1st title of the year and the 1st of his career. It was Kodes's 1st title of the year and the 14th of his career.

References

External links 
 ITF tournament edition details
 ATP tournament profile
 Official website

 
Bavarian International Tennis Championships
Bavarian Tennis Championships
Bavarian Tennis Championships
Bavarian Tennis Championships